The Great Order Party is a liberal political party in Azerbaijan.

At the parliamentary elections of 6 November 2005 the party won 1 out of 125 seats.

Fazil Mustafa has been the party's only Member of parliament.

Political parties in Azerbaijan
Political parties with year of establishment missing
Liberal parties in Azerbaijan
Liberal parties